Jakub Skrobanek (born c. 1835 - died 1910) was a merchant, banker and mayor of Cieszyn.

He was owner of tenement on marketplace in Cieszyn. From 1873 until 1894 he was councillor of Cieszyn. From 1875, after resignation of Johann Demel von Elswehr, until 1876 he served as mayor of the city.

On 16 February 1898 he became Honorary Citizen of Cieszyn.

References 
 Gojniczek Wacław, Burmistrzowie Cieszyna od XIV do XX wieku, (in:) 500 lat ratusza i rynku w Cieszynie, Cieszyn 1996, p. 76.
 Peter Anton, Geschichte der Stadt Teschen, Cieszyn 1888, p. 65.
 Spyra Janusz, Honorowi obywatele miasta Cieszyna 1849-1938, (in:) 500 lat ratusza i rynku w Cieszynie, Cieszyn 1996, p. 98.

External links 
 Morys-Twarowski Michael, “Skrobanek Jakub, kupec, starosta a čestný občan Těšína,” in Biografický slovník Slezska a severní Moravy. Supplementum, eds. Lubomír Dokoupil, Radoslav Daněk, Aleš Zářický (Ostrava, 2018): 4:161–162.

People from Austrian Silesia
People from Cieszyn Silesia
1830s births
1910 deaths
Mayors of places in Poland
Polish merchants